Portugal returned at the 1994 Winter Olympics in Lillehammer, Norway after missed in 1992.

A single competitor participated in one sport -- alpine skiing -- but no medal was gained.

Competitors
The following is the list of number of competitors in the Games.

Alpine skiing

Men

References

Nations at the 1994 Winter Olympics
1994 Winter Olympics
1994 in Portuguese sport